Tammelan Stadion is a football stadium in Tampere, Finland that is currently undergoing major renovation.
It is the home ground for the Veikkausliiga club Ilves and the Kakkonen sides TPV and Tampere United. The Ilves women's team, which plays in the Naisten liiga, also uses the stadium. The new facility is expected to be available for the 2024 season.

History 
The stadium's history began in 1926 when the city council made a decision to build a football field in Tammela. However, construction advanced rather slowly due to a lack of funds. The situation worsened during the depression of the late 1920s and early 1930s. The field was opened in 1931, but a stadium-like look was reached only in 1937 when the first stand was built.
The stands were expanded in 1993 to a nominal capacity of 5 050 but only the main stand had numbered seats, 1 300 in all.
The attendance record for the stadium was set on October 2, 1994, when 5 490 spectators watched a game between TPV and HJK.

Future 
The previous stadium did not meet the requirements set by Veikkausliiga, so a replacement was necessary. The city of Tampere held an architecture competition in 2014, in which a proposal called Hattutemppu (‘hat trick’) by JKMM Arkkitehdit was chosen as the basis for the development project. The new building will comprise apartments as well as office and retail space in addition to the stadium proper.
The new stadium was originally set to seat approximately 6 500 spectators and meet the UEFA Category 3 criteria. However, in December 2020, the city council decided to increase allocated funding so that the stadium would have 8 000 seats and meet the criteria for Category 4, which makes it an eligible ground for top-level football matches.
The plan is to implement shopping center, parking and auxiliary facilities on the ground level of the stadium. Among other things, Kesko will lease retail space of almost 2,500 square meters, which will include a large K-Supermarket grocery store. In addition, the business premises will include a Pancho Villa restaurant.

References

Football venues in Finland
Buildings and structures in Tampere
Tampereen Pallo-Veikot
Sports venues completed in 1931
1931 establishments in Finland